Giltedge was a  Irish Sport Horse that was ridden by American David O'Connor at the international level in the sport of eventing.

Giltedge, formally known as Giltex, was bought by Jackie Mars from Irish eventer Eric Smiley as a mount for American rider David O'Connor. Although described by his rider as being less inherently gifted when compared to some of his stable mates (such as Custom Made), Giltedge's  work ethic helped him to succeed.

Giltedge's first three-day in the United States was the 1994 Fair Hill. The event ended in disaster when a misjudged take-off distance from the obstacle resulted in a fall for O'Connor. During the pair's second three-day, the gelding caught his leg on a fence and flipped, leading to a punctured lung for his rider. It wasn't until their third three-day, at the 1995 Fair Hill, where Giltedge showed his ability, finishing second by 0.1 penalties. After that event, the horse would never be out of the top ten placings.

Giltedge was selected for the United States eventing team for the 1996 Olympics in Atlanta. A good dressage test combined with a clean cross-country and stadium round, helped the team to clinch the silver medal by two penalties—the country's first eventing team medal in an Olympics or World Championship in 12 years. Giltedge also competed four years later at the 2000 Sydney Olympics, as part of the bronze medal team.

Giltedge's final three-day was the 2002 World Equestrian Games held in Jerez, Spain. The gelding was the first American horse on cross-country, and the course was found to be quite slick. A lack of traction due to studs that were too small, resulted in O'Conner's decision to slow down, so as to prevent a fall. Unfortunately, the pair finished with 30.40 time faults. However, a clear stadium round, one of only 5 in the competition, helped the United States capture a long-awaited team gold.

Giltedge was retired at the Rolex Kentucky Three Day in 2003. He enjoyed his retirement at Stonehall Farm, and gave demonstrations with the O'Connors.

Major Accomplishments

2002
 Horse of the Year, Chronicle of the Horse
 Team Gold, World Equestrian Games, Jerez, Spain

2001
 National Performance Horse Registry Silver Stirrup Award, Adv. Level Eventing Champion
 1st Rolex Kentucky CCI****

2000
 Team Bronze Olympic Games, Sydney, Australia
 8th Foxhall CCI***

1999
 Team Gold, Individual Silver Pan American Games, Winnipeg, Canada
 1st North American Beaulieu CIC***

1998
 Team Bronze, 6th World Equestrian Games, Rome, Italy

1997
 National Performance Horse Registry Silver Stirrup Award, High Score Horse
 1st, Fair Hill CCI***
 3rd, Punchestwon CCI***

1996
 Team Silver Olympic Games, Atlanta, Georgia

1995
 1st Fair Hill CCI***

References

External links 
 Giltedge's pedigree
 Photo of Giltedge 

Eventing horses
Horses in the Olympics
Horses in the Pan American Games
1986 animal births
2015 animal deaths